Kindziulis is a fictional character from Lithuanian joke cycle commonly known as "Here came Kindzulis". The punch lines of the jokes of this cycle start with the standard phrase "Here comes Kinzsiulis and says:..." The Kindziulis character was created by theatre director  and these jokes, written by collective efforts, were regularly printed in the Lithuanian satirical magazine Šluota.

During the Communist times many of them were an element of Communist propaganda:
A tourist asks, why the Bundestag building is round?
Here comes Kindziulis and says: Where have you seen a circus of a different shape?

Kindziulis jokes have become less popular in post-Soviet times.

Sample jokes from the Union of Lithuanian Journalists website:
Two citizens are talking: - As the building materials became more expensive, it is simply impossible to build a house or an apartment! 
Here Kindziulis approached and advised:
- Build yurts.

A company boss says to an applicant:
- I hire only people with exemplary behavior.
Here comes Kindziulis and says:
- Well, he was just released from prison ahead of time for the exemplary behavior.

Journalist and writer , a long-time editor-in-chief of Šluota, published  the collections of jokes titled Čia priėjo Kindziulis several times (1970, 1972, 1982).

References

Fictional Lithuanian people
Stock characters in jokes
Joke cycles
Lithuanian humour